Sydney Anderson (September 18, 1881 – October 8, 1948) was a Representative from Minnesota; born in Zumbrota, Minnesota. 

After attending primary schools he served as a private in Company D, Fourteenth Regiment, Minnesota Volunteer Infantry, during the Spanish–American War in 1898. He graduated from high school in 1899 and attended Highland Park College, Des Moines, Iowa, afterwards the University of Minnesota at Minneapolis. He studied law and moved to Kansas City, Missouri, later to Lanesboro, Minnesota, continuing his law practice from 1904–1911.
 
In 1910 at the age of 29, he defeated incumbent James Albertus Tawney in the Republican primary election with the support of Theodore Roosevelt, Gifford Pinchot and other Progressive Republicans, running on a platform of drastically reduced tariffs and opposition to Cannonism. He was subsequently elected to the 62nd, 63rd, 64th, 65th, 66th, 67th, and 68th congresses, (March 4, 1911 – March 3, 1925). 

Anderson chaired the Congressional Joint Commission of Agricultural Inquiry in 1921 and 1922. He declined to be a candidate for reelection in 1924 to the 69th congress. Anderson later became Vice Chairman of the research council of the National Transportation Institute at Washington, DC, in 1923 and 1924; President of the Millers' National Federation, Chicago, IL, and Washington, DC, 1924–1929; Vice-President, Secretary, and, later, member of the board of directors of General Mills, Inc., Minneapolis, 1930–1948; and, finally, president of the Transportation Association of America, Chicago, 1943–1948.

Anderson died in Minneapolis  on October 8th 1948 at the age of 67, and was buried in Lakewood Cemetery, in Minneapolis.

References

External links
 

 

1881 births
1948 deaths
People from Zumbrota, Minnesota
American people of Norwegian descent
American people of Swedish descent
Presbyterians from Minnesota
Republican Party members of the United States House of Representatives from Minnesota
Minnesota lawyers
People from Lanesboro, Minnesota
20th-century American politicians
20th-century American lawyers
University of Minnesota alumni
American military personnel of the Spanish–American War